The 1985 Amílcar Cabral Cup was held in Banjul, Gambia.

Group stage

Group A

Sierra Leone won the 2nd place by a toss of coin.

Group B

Knockout stage

Semi-finals

Third place match

Final

References
RSSSF archives

Amílcar Cabral Cup
Sport in the Gambia